Forficula smyrnensis is a species of earwig in the family Forficulidae. It is mostly found in the Palearctic realm.

References 

Forficulidae
Insects of Europe
Insects of Asia
Insects described in 1839